Coq3 O-methyltransferase may refer to:

 Hexaprenyldihydroxybenzoate methyltransferase
 3-demethylubiquinone-9 3-O-methyltransferase